Bay FM is the on-air name used by four unconnected Australian radio stations:

Bay FM (Byron Bay): a community radio station in Byron Bay, New South Wales
93.9 Bay FM: an adult contemporary-formatted commercial radio station in Geelong, Victoria
Bay FM 99.3: a classic hits-formatted narrowcast radio station in Nelson Bay, New South Wales
Bay FM (Brisbane): a community radio station in Brisbane, Queensland

Bay FM is also used as an on-air call-sign for other radio stations throughout the world:
South Africa: Bay FM 107.9 is a community radio station base in Port Elizabeth.
Japan: BAY-FM (Chiba, Japan), or JOGV-FM, a radio station in Chiba City, Japan.
United Kingdom: Bay FM Exmouth is located in Exmouth, Devon.
Malta: 897 Bay FM Malta (89.7 FM)